Alsviķi Parish is an administrative unit of the Alūksne Municipality, Latvia.

Towns, villages and settlements of Alsviķi parish 

Parishes of Latvia
Alūksne Municipality